Don't Let Go is the twelfth studio album by American keyboardist and record producer George Duke released in 1978 through Epic Records. 
The album peaked at No. 39 on the US Billboard 200 and at No. 5 on the  US Billboard Top Soul Albums chart.

Overview
Don't Let Go was produced by George Duke. Recording sessions for the album took place at Paramount Recording Studios in Los Angeles, California. 
The album features guest appearances from Duke's frequent collaborators, guitarist Charles "Icarus" Johnson, bassist Byron Miller, drummer Leon "Ndugu" Chancler and percussionist Sheila Escovedo with guest appearances from Josie James and Napoleon Murphy Brock on lead vocals, Petsye Powell and Pattie Brooks on backing vocals, Roland Bautista and Wah Wah Watson on guitars, and Carol Shive and Judy Geist on violins.

Singles
"Dukey Stick" reached No. 4 on the Billboard Hot R&B/Hip-Hop Songs chart.

Track listing

Personnel 
 George Duke – keyboards, vocals,  narrator 
 Charles "Icarus" Johnson – guitar, narrator 
 Wah Wah Watson – guitar licks (track 1 only)
 Roland Bautista – rhythm guitar 
 Byron Lee Miller – bass, narrator 
 Leon "Ndugu" Chancler – drums, timbales, narrator 
 Sheila E. – congas, percussion, narrator 
 Carol Shive – violin
 Judy Geist – violin 
 Petsye Powell – backing vocals
 Pattie Brooks – backing vocals
 Josie James – lead vocals 
 Napoleon Murphy Brock – lead vocals

Production 
 George Duke – producer
 Kerry McNabb – engineer
 Mitch Gibson – assistant engineer
 John Golden – mastering at Kendun Recorders (Burbank, California).
 Glen Christensen – art direction
 Norman Seeff – photography
 Herb Cohen – management

Chart history

References

External links 
 George Duke's 1970s discography on his website

1978 albums
George Duke albums
Epic Records albums
Albums produced by George Duke